"I Don't Care" is a song by English singer-songwriter Ed Sheeran and Canadian singer Justin Bieber. It was released on May 10, 2019 through Asylum, Atlantic Records and Def Jam Recordings as the lead single from the former's compilation album, No.6 Collaborations Project (2019). Sheeran previewed the song on his Instagram on May 5, 2019, and Bieber shared another part of the song the following day, before both artists announced the full title and release date on May 7.

The dancehall-influenced song peaked at number one in 26 countries (including the UK Singles Chart). It additionally peaked at number two in seven other countries (including the US Billboard Hot 100); it was blocked from reaching the summit in all those countries by Lil Nas X's and Billy Ray Cyrus's hit "Old Town Road". "I Don't Care" was certified diamond in Brazil and France, six-times platinum in Canada, and multi-platinum in twelve additional countries.

Background
"I Don't Care" marks the fourth collaboration between Sheeran and Bieber; they had both contributed guest vocals on Lil Dicky's 2019 song "Earth" for Earth Day 2019, in addition to co-writing Bieber's 2015 song "Love Yourself", and Major Lazer's 2016 song "Cold Water", which featured Bieber and Danish singer MØ.

The song was produced by Max Martin, Shellback, and Fred Gibson. It was Sheeran's first release of new music in two years, since his Grammy-winning album ÷ in March 2017.

Composition
"I Don't Care" is performed in the key of F major with a tempo of 100 beats per minute in common time.  It follows a chord progression of F–Dm–B–C, and the vocals span two octaves, from C3 to C5. The song has been noted for its similarity to English singer Cheryl's 2014 single also entitled "I Don't Care".

Critical reception
Writing for The Guardian, Alexis Petridis gave the song four stars out of five, praising the synergy between two "seismic stars", who have previously collaborated on "Love Yourself", and describing the chorus as "breezily infectious." Craig Jenkins of Vulture called the lyrics "down-to-earth" and praised the combination of Bieber's "ear for pop sounds" and Sheeran's "knack for a soaring melody", noting that Bieber and Sheeran complement each other in their talents.

Writing for Pitchfork, Quinn Moreland stated that the song "just hangs around apathetically and threatens never to leave your brain."

Promotion
Both Sheeran and Bieber have shared posts alluding to an upcoming release on their respective social media accounts. Bieber initially tweeted "Big fan" at Sheeran, and several days later, posted pictures of himself and Sheeran wearing Hawaiian shirts and standing in front of a green screen. Bieber also posted an edit of the pictures, with himself "spooning" Sheeran, with the caption "10". Several days later, he posted the number 7 against a black background, and the next day tweeted "6", which was reported as a countdown set to end on May 10. The same day, Sheeran and Bieber also shared the same poll on their Instagram accounts, asking followers "Do you want new music?" with the options "Yes", "No" and "IDC".

On May 5, Sheeran and Bieber shared a short clip of the song on their Instagram of him saying they have "new music" coming out, before showing his computer and pressing play on a file named "idc_v05.10.wav". Bieber previewed part of the same file on his Instagram after Sheeran, confirming his involvement, as well as tagging Sheeran with the caption "Friday". The full title and release date were formally announced on both artists' social media on May 7.

Commercial performance
On Spotify, "I Don't Care" which garnered astonishing 16.241 million streams in the first 24 hours, debuted with 10.977 million daily global streams, breaking the streaming platform's single-day streaming record and subsequently topping the previous record of 10.819 million, set by Mariah Carey's "All I Want for Christmas Is You". It has topped the Spotify Global chart for six weeks as of June 2019. It debuted at number one on the UK Singles Chart on May 17, 2019, becoming Sheeran's sixth and Bieber's seventh UK number one and remaining there for eight consecutive weeks. It debuted at number 2 on the US Billboard Hot 100 behind "Old Town Road" by Lil Nas X and Billy Ray Cyrus and stayed at that position for a second week. The song also became Sheeran's fourth number one on the Billboard Mainstream Top 40, while it marked Bieber's sixth number one on the chart. On Billboard's Dance/Mix Show Airplay, it became the second number one for Sheeran and the fifth chart topper for Bieber.

Music video
The music video for "I Don't Care" was released on May 17, 2019. It was directed by Emil Nava, and filmed in Japan and LA.

The video was described by Liz Calvario of ET Online as a "fun and playful visual" for the song, which she described as a "feel-good track".

The music video was released on May 17, 2019 and garnered over 554 million views as of March 2023.

Credits and personnel
Credits adapted from Tidal.

Ed Sheeran – vocals, songwriter
Justin Bieber – vocals, songwriter
Jason Boyd – songwriting
Max Martin – backing vocals, songwriter, producer, keyboards
Shellback – songwriter, producer, keyboards, programmer
Fred Gibson – backing vocals, beatbox vocals, songwriter, producer, programmer, guitar, drums, keyboards, engineer
Benjy Gibson – backing vocals, percussion

Emma Corby – brass arranger 
Georgia Gibson – saxophone
Inaam Haq – assistant
John Hanes – engineer
Josh Gudwin – production, recording
Michael Ilbert – engineer
Serban Ghenea – mixer

Charts

Weekly charts

Monthly charts

Year-end charts

Certifications

See also

 List of airplay number-one hits of the 2010s (Argentina)
 List of number-one singles of 2019 (Australia)
 List of number-one hits of 2019 (Austria)
 List of number-one hits of 2019 (Denmark)
 List of number-one singles of 2019 (Finland)
 List of number-one singles of 2019 (Ireland)
 List of number-one songs of 2019 (Malaysia)
 List of number-one songs in Norway
 List of number-one singles of 2019 (Portugal)
 List of number-one singles of the 2010s (Sweden)
 List of number-one hits of 2019 (Switzerland)
 List of UK Singles Chart number ones of the 2010s

References

2019 singles
2019 songs
Ed Sheeran songs
Justin Bieber songs
Irish Singles Chart number-one singles
Number-one singles in Australia
Number-one singles in Denmark
Number-one singles in Finland
Number-one singles in Greece
Number-one singles in Hungary
Number-one singles in Iceland
Number-one singles in Israel
Number-one singles in Italy
Number-one singles in Malaysia
Number-one singles in Norway
Number-one singles in Portugal
Number-one singles in Sweden
Number-one singles in Switzerland
Songs written by Ed Sheeran
Songs written by Justin Bieber
UK Singles Chart number-one singles
Songs written by Fred Again
Songs written by Poo Bear
Songs written by Max Martin
Songs written by Shellback (record producer)
Song recordings produced by Max Martin
Song recordings produced by Shellback (record producer)
Atlantic Records UK singles
Def Jam Recordings singles
Warner Music Group singles
Male vocal duets
Electropop songs
Dancehall songs